Nioro Airport  is an airport serving Nioro du Sahel in the Kayes Region of western Mali.

See also
Transport in Mali

References

 OurAirports - Mali
 Great Circle Mapper - Nioro
 Nioro
 Google Earth

External links

Airports in Mali